Trnovec is a settlement on the left bank of the Polskava River in the Municipality of Videm in eastern Slovenia. The area traditionally belonged to the Styria region. It is now included in the Drava Statistical Region.

References

External links
Trnovec on Geopedia

Populated places in the Municipality of Videm